Dennis Holahan (born November 7, 1942 in Stamford, Connecticut) is an American attorney and former actor. He is a partner in the San Francisco office of Lewis Brisbois Bisgaard & Smith, California’s largest law firm, where he specializes in entertainment, media and intellectual property cases as well as more general matters in the firm’s commercial litigation practice. Prior to joining Lewis Brisbois in 2014, Dennis maintained one of the top entertainment and business-related litigation boutiques in Los Angeles for more than 20 years.

Early life and education
Holahan was raised in Connecticut. After graduating from Yale in 1965, Holahan served as an officer (Lieutenant, J.G.) in the United States Navy on an amphibious assault ship in Vietnam from 1967 to 1969.  He was awarded the Vietnam Service Medal with a silver star for five campaigns, a National Defense Service Medal, a Meritorious Unit Commendation, the Republic of Vietnam Meritorious Unit Citation, and the Republic of Vietnam Campaign Medal.

Career
Holahan graduated from Hastings College of Law in 1973. At Hastings he was the recipient of the Hale Moot Court Prize for Best Brief, was an editor of the Hastings Law News, 1972–1973, and a founder of the Hastings Child Care Center. After Hastings he worked for a litigation firm in the financial district in San Francisco for two years.

Acting
From 1976 to 1992, he took a hiatus from his law practice to pursue a successful career as an actor in films and television. Holahan is best known for appearing with Al Pacino in the crime film Scarface as Jerry the Banker. Notable other roles included Collision Course, Kuffs, Haywire (mini-series) and Aspen Extreme, as well as television appearances in M*A*S*H, Hill Street Blues, Lou Grant and The Rockford Files. He also appeared in the movie The Vegas Strip War in 1984 playing Jimmy Weldstrom.  He played a lawyer in his 1981 appearance on The White Shadow. His character interviewed James Hayward (Thomas Carter) for a summer job.

Return to law
In 1992 Holahan went back to the legal career he had put on hold in 1976. He started the Law Office of Dennis Holahan, which was based in Los Angeles and specialized in entertainment law, winning several high profile cases.

Personal life
He has two children, Nicholas Drew Holahan and Belle Holahan Casares, from his first marriage to Wylie O'Hara (1966–1972), and seven grandchildren.  Holahan was married to actress Loretta Swit from 1983 to 1995.  Holahan is active in the area of drug and alcohol recovery and has served on the board of McIntyre House, a non-profit recovery house for men recovering from alcoholism and drug addiction located in Los Angeles.  Holahan also has served on the board of Worth Our Weight, a non-profit organization in Santa Rosa, California which trains and educates teenagers and young adults who have survived foster care programs and teaches them how to work in the fine dining industry.

Filmography

Films

Television

References

External links
 

1942 births
20th-century American lawyers
20th-century American male actors
21st-century American lawyers
American entertainment lawyers
American male film actors
American male television actors
United States Navy personnel of the Vietnam War
California lawyers
Living people
Male actors from Stamford, Connecticut
Military personnel from Connecticut
Phillips Academy alumni
University of California, Hastings College of the Law alumni
Yale College alumni